Sergio Garcia is a Spanish professional vert skater. Garcia started skating when he was ten years old in 2000 and turned professional in 2009. Garcia has attended many competitions in his vert skating career.

Best Tricks Double Backflip, McTwist 540.

Vert Competitions 
2012 EC Halfpipe Copenhagen - Vert: 7th
2009 Broken Bones Tour - Vert: 3rd

References

External links
copenhagen denmark results
double backflip

1990 births
Living people
Vert skaters
X Games athletes